The Paideia School is a private independent school in the Druid Hills neighborhood of Atlanta, Georgia. It enrolls children ages 3 through 18.

History
In November 1970, when there was a rush among southern communities to open segregation academies to fight federally mandated integration of the public schools, a group get together to found a less-segregated private school. The founders planned to open a school in September of 1971, but they didn't have a location or any students. Their headmaster was only 25 and had no experience in administrations. The Paideia School opened for the fall semester in 1971 with 145 students in a building at 1509 Ponce de Leon in Druid Hills.

Alumni
 Sarah Bianchi, Deputy United States Trade Representative
 Rembert Browne, a writer who primarily focuses on pop culture, politics and sports
 Tommy Dorfman, an American actress known for her work in the Netflix series 13 Reasons Why
 Alisha Kramer, an American doctor and health activist
 Jon Ossoff, U.S. senator from Georgia since 2021
 Daniel Platzman, an American songwriter, composer, and the drummer for the pop rock band Imagine Dragons
 Bex Taylor-Klaus, an American actor known for their work in Arrow, Scream, and Voltron: Legendary Defender

References

External links
 

Private K-12 schools in DeKalb County, Georgia
Private K-12 schools in Atlanta
Druid Hills, Georgia
Educational institutions established in 1971
1971 establishments in Georgia (U.S. state)